Face is a 1999 British novel by British-Jamaican author and poet Benjamin Zephaniah. It is about a young boy who suffers facial injuries in a joyriding accident. Face has also been adapted as a stage play. It follows the story of Martin , a British year teen living in east London , and how his and his friends and family’s life changed after a horrific car crash.

Reception
Critical reception for Face has been mixed to positive, with Booklist saying "Martin's personal growth may lack literary finesse, but his struggle to overcome adversity will still involve some readers." Publishers Weekly praised the book's message but remarked that the plot was "somewhat formulaic".

References 

1999 British novels
British children's novels
Bloomsbury Publishing books
Burn survivors in fiction
Novels set in London